Hinduism is a minority religion in Slovenia. ISKCON was registered in Slovenia in 1983 and The Hindu Religious Community in Slovenia was registered in 2003 in Ljubljana

There were 620 (0.03%) Hindus in Slovenia as of 2013.

International Society for Krishna Consciousness

The International Society for Krishna Consciousness, more commonly known as the Hare Krishna movement, was registered in Slovenia in 1983 and has a religious centre in Ljubljana. The International Society for Krishna Consciousness in Slovenia has an agreement with the state, and has received about €1,500  from the government.

Demographics

620 Hindus live in Slovenia, with:
70 belonging to the Hindu Religious Community in Slovenia
150 belonging to the Society for Krishna Consciousness
70 belonging to Yoga in Daily Life 
60 belonging to  Esoteric School of Tantra ‘Vama Marga’ – Kriya Tantra Yoga
20 belonging to Namaste Society (Yoga studio Sadhana)
20 belonging to  Satya Society
50 belonging to  Sahaya Yoga
10 belonging to  Suryashakti Yoga Center
50 belonging to The Art of Living
40 belonging to the Transcendental Meditation – Ljubljana Transcendental Meditation Society
50 belonging to the Sai Baba – Sathya Sai Baba Society for the Development of Human Values
20 belonging to Sri Chinmoj Centre 
10 belonging to the Osho Information Center.

Yoga in Daily Life

Yoga in Daily Life has eleven centres in Slovenia.

Centre one - Ljubljana
Centre two - Maribor
Centre three - Kranj
Centre four - Novo Mesto
Centre five -  Domžale
Centre six - Yoga Center Celje Petrovče
Centre seven - Koper
Centre eight - Nova Gorica
Centre nine - Škofja Loka
Centre ten - Popetre
Centre eleven - Ribnica

See also 
Persecution of Hindus
Hinduism in Austria

References

External links
Hare Krishna in Slovenia
Društvo Joga v vsakdanjem življenju
Sri Chinmoy Centre
Worldwide Religious News
Slovenia: At a Distance from a Perfect Religious Market
Srila Bhakti Vaibhava Puri Goswami Maharaja in Slovenia and Croatia

Religious communities which hold legal person status in the Republic of Slovenia

Slovenia
Religion in Slovenia
Slovenia